The William Brown Company Hosiery Mill, located at 3400-3412 J Street in Philadelphia, Pennsylvania, was added to the National Register of Historic Places on January 17, 2019.

References

Buildings and structures in Philadelphia
National Register of Historic Places in Pennsylvania